Jessica Finney (born 7 December 1995) is a British professional racing cyclist, who currently rides for UCI Women's Continental Team .

References

External links

1995 births
Living people
British female cyclists
Place of birth missing (living people)
Alumni of the University of Portsmouth
21st-century British women